Grover Pleasant Nutt Jr. (March 31, 1921 – July 24, 2012) was an American football coach.  He was the 18th head football coach
ag the Ottawa University in Ottawa, Kansas, serving for one season, in 1956, and compiling a record of 0–9.
 He died in 2012.

Head coaching record

References

1921 births
2012 deaths
Ottawa Braves football coaches
People from Coffey County, Kansas